Billy Dec is an American television personality, actor, and businessman in the entertainment and hospitality industries. He is the CEO/Founder of hospitality management company Rockit Ranch, marketing agency COACT, and human resources firm HR Pro. He makes regular television appearances discussing food and entertainment, and his acting credits include Criminal Minds and Empire. He also hosts a podcast, The Meal of Your Life!.

Dec has also served on the White House Advisory Commission on Asian Americans & Pacific Islanders, the White House Bullying Prevention Task Force, and was the director of cultural relations on the Chicago 2016 Olympic committee.

Early life and education
Dec was born and raised in Chicago, and educated at St. Clement School and the Latin School of Chicago. Upon graduation, Dec attended the University of Illinois at Urbana–Champaign, majoring in Economics/Pre-Law. During his time in college, he worked as a nightclub bouncer. After graduation, he was offered a job as a promoter, but turned it down to attend law school at Chicago Kent College of Law.

Hospitality industry
During his first year of law school, Dec established his first club, Solo. While in law school, he went on to open Equinox Wine Bar, Dragon Room, Circus and The Bedroom.

In 2002, Dec and business partner Brad Young formed Rockit Ranch Productions, a restaurant and nightclub development and management company. Their first nightclub venture was Le Passage Nightclub, and their first restaurant was Rockit Bar and Grill, a restaurant themed around rock music. The company went on to open more venues including Rockit, Underground, Sunda, and Rockit Burger Bar.

Entertainment industry
In 2015, Dec launched a Chicago-based production company, Elston Films, with his wife Kat Stephans and producers DeAnna Cooper and Kevin Cooper.

Dec hosts a podcast entitled The Meal of Your Life, in which he interviews celebrity guests about a defining meal that has affected their lives. Past guests include David Schwimmer, Andrew Zimmern, Macy Gray, Carla Hall, Ming Tsai, Curtis Stone, and Rahm Emanuel.

Charity work
Dec is a supporter of several non-profit organizations and charity events based in Chicago, including Make-A-Wish Illinois, Best Buddies, Asian Americans Advancing Justice, the American Cancer Society, the Lookingglass Theatre Company, and Maggie Daley's After School Matters. He was the director of cultural relations on the Chicago 2016 Olympic committee, responsible for attracting celebrity support for the city's Olympic bid.

Personal life
In 2009, Dec married Katherine Stephans.

Filmography

Film and television
 2019: Food. Roots., Himself
 2018: Mollywood, Rush
 2018: Miss Arizona, DJ Solid
 2018: The Law of Moises, Jim Boone
 2017: Chasing the Blues, Officer Frye
 2016: Chicago Fire, FF Belzer
 2016: Chasing Gold, Taze
 2016: American Crime Story, expert
 2016: Jessica, Gerry
 2015: Chasing Grace, Officer Reddick 
 2015: Entourage, Billy Dec
 2015: Powers, cop
 2015: Empire, Alan Lester
 2014: Criminal Minds, Detective Paul Rosado
 2014: NightLights, medic #1
 2013: One Small Hitch, concierge
 2012: I Heart Shakey, party patron
 2012: Adventures in the Sin Bin, REO Monitor
 2011: The Chicago Code, receptionist
 2011: The Rites of Joy May, hipster
 2009: Entourage, agent
 2009: The Beast, agent / FBI Tactical Officer
 2009: Baby on Board, attorney
 1999-2004: Friends, multiple characters
 1996: Book of Swords, martial arts fighter

Television guest appearances
 2019: Today in Nashville, guest 
 2018: Today in Nashville, guest cohost
 2007-2019: Today Show, food contributor
 2016: Weekend Today, guest
 2016: The Meredith Vieira Show, guest
 2011-2016: Windy City LIVE, entertainment contributor
 2014: Frankenfood, guest judge
 2014: Good Morning America, food contributor
 2014: Chicagoland, guest
 2014: Fox & Friends, food contributor
 2008: 24/7 Chicago, host

Awards

References

External links 
 Official Website of Billy Dec
 Billy Dec's blog
 

Latin School of Chicago alumni
Living people
American people of Filipino descent
Harvard Business School alumni
Businesspeople from Chicago
Year of birth missing (living people)
Chicago-Kent College of Law alumni